Mai Allah Wassai (b. 1928, d. 29 April 2003) was a famous and popular folk and light classical Sindhi singer of Sindh, Pakistan.

Early life
Allah Wassai was born in 1928 in Sujawal city of Sujawal District of Sindh, Pakistan.

Services
Mai Allah Wassai had sung popular folk and light classical songs which were broadcast from Pakistan Broadcasting Corporation, Hyderabad and televised from Pakistan Television Corporation center Karachi. Her audio cassette was issued by Institute of Sindhology University of Sindh Jamshoro in 1999. She was awarded with Tamagh-e-Imtiaz, a national award by Government of Pakistan on 23 March 2007, after her death. She performed at Shah Abdul Latif Bhittai Conference on the occasion of Urs of Shah Abdul Latif Bhittai at Bhit Shah, Hyderabad and she was awarded with Shah Latif award by Culture Department Government of Sindh.

Death
She died on 29 April 2003.

References

Sindhi-language singers
Sindhi people
Recipients of Tamgha-e-Imtiaz
1928 births
2003 deaths
20th-century Pakistani women singers
Recipients of Latif Award